Kalo Chhaya (Dark Shadows) is a Bengali suspense thriller film directed by Premendra Mitra and produced by Gouranga Prasad Basu. This film was released on 17 December 1948 in the banner of Eastern Studio.

Plot

A lady visited Mr. Surajit Roy, a detective, with a proposal to steal a will from a landlord's house. Surajit did not accept the assignment. Soon after, he  received a telegram from one Rajib Lochan Choudhury, zamindar of a remote village in Murshidabad district. It appeared that Rajib Lochan's life was in danger. When Surajit visited his house the zaminder had already been murdered. Detective Surajit started an investigation while staying at the house. He saw a nurse, Anima, appointed for Rajib Lochan and recalled that this lady went to him with the proposal of theft . There were several relatives and servants in the house but most of them concealed a some or other facts from him. Finally Surajit was successful to track down the real culprit.

Cast
 Dhiraj Bhattacharya as Dinannath Chowdhury/Rajib lochan Chowdhury
 Sisir Mitra as Detective Surajit Roy
 Nabadwip Haldar as Surajit's assistant
 Gurudas Banerjee as Doctor alias Pitambar Chowdhury
 Shyam Laha as Chinese Cook
 Sipra Mitra as Anima Devi, nurse
 Nani Majumdar
 Haridas Chatterjee

References

External links
 

Indian detective films
1948 films
Bengali-language Indian films
Indian crime thriller films
1940s Bengali-language films
Films directed by Premendra Mitra
1940s crime thriller films
Indian black-and-white films